Roger A. Carter (born October 28, 1961, in Sandusky, Ohio) is a former American professional darts player who plays in British Darts Organisation and Professional Darts Corporation events.

Career

Carter appeared in the BDO World Darts Championship four times with his best run being in 1997 when he made it to the Quarter finals, where he lost to Marshall James. Since 2000, Carter has played in PDC tournaments, playing mainly in their North American events, including the Las Vegas Desert Classic, the World Series of Darts and the US Open which replaced the World Series in 2007. Carter hit a nine-darter during the Desert Classic qualifiers but eventually failed to qualify for the event.

He currently lives in Auburn, Alabama.

World Championship Results

BDO
 1996: 1st Round (lost to Geoff Wylie 1–3) (sets)
 1997: Quarter-Finals (lost to Marshall James 3–4)
 1998: 2nd Round (lost to Roland Scholten 1–3)
 1999: 1st Round (lost to Ted Hankey 1–3)

References

External links
Profile and stats on Darts Database

1961 births
Sportspeople from Sandusky, Ohio
American darts players
Living people
British Darts Organisation players
Professional Darts Corporation associate players